The British Rally Championship is a rallying series based in the United Kingdom. The first championship was run in 1958 and it has been licensed by the Motor Sports Association (MSA) since 1999. MSA has opted not to run the series in 2015, instead giving its promotion to its own subsidiary (IMS) for 2016.

Champions

British Rally Championship 

*In 2000, Ipatti used both Kari Kajala and Teppo Leino as co-drivers during the season. Hence, runner-up Mark Higgins' co-driver Bryan Thomas was awarded the co-drivers title. Two similar situations occurred in 2004 & 2008. In 2004 David Higgins used Chris Wood, Craig Thorley & Daniel Barritt as co-drivers during the season. Hence, runner-up Austin MacHale' co-driver Brian Murphy was awarded the co-drivers title. In 2008,Wilks used both Phil Pugh and David Moynihan as co-drivers during the season. Again, runner-up Mark Higgins' co-driver Rory Kennedy was awarded the co-drivers title.

RACMSA British Rally Championship

RACMSA British Open Rally Championship

RAC British Rally Championship

Multiple wins by individual

Multiple wins by car manufacturer

See also
World Rally Championship
Scottish Rally Championship

References

External links
British Rally Championship - Official Site

 
Rally racing series
1958 establishments in the United Kingdom
Recurring sporting events established in 1958
Auto racing series in the United Kingdom
National championships in the United Kingdom